Patricia Kovács (born 26 May 1996) is an Austrian handballer for Mosonmagyaróvári KC SE and the Austria national team.

International honours
WHA:
Winner: 2016, 2017

Personal life
She is the daughter of Hypo Niederösterreich's coach, Ferenc Kovács, who relocated to Austria. Her sister, Klaudia Kovács, is a handball player as well.

References

1996 births
Living people
People from Lustenau
Austrian female handball players
Expatriate handball players
Austrian expatriate sportspeople in Hungary
Austrian people of Hungarian descent
Sportspeople from Vorarlberg